Conospermum huegelii, commonly known as the slender smokebush, is a plant endemic to Western Australia.

It blooms between July and October producing blue-cream flowers. The perennial herb has short leafy stems.

The species was first formally described by the botanist Stephan Endlicher in 1838 as part of the work Stirpium Australasicarum Herbarii Hugeliani Decades Tres. The only synonym is Conospermum intricatum. The specific epithet honours the botanist Karl von Hugel.

It is found in swampy areas and among granite outcrops in the Swan Coastal Plain and in the Darling Range of Western Australia where it grows in sandy-gravelly soils.

The attractive ornamental plant is suitable for gardens or containers. The flowers are used for decoration and long lasting. It is reasonably difficult to establish, propagation is by cuttings can be sown by seed.

References

External links

Eudicots of Western Australia
huegelii
Endemic flora of Western Australia
Plants described in 1838